CatSper3, is a protein which in humans is encoded by the CATSPER3 gene. CatSper3 is a member of the cation channels of sperm family of proteins. The four proteins in this family together form a Ca2+-permeant ion channel specific essential for the correct function of sperm cells.

References 

Ion channels